Crumb is a surname.

Those bearing it include:
 George Crumb (1929–2022), composer
 David Crumb (born 1962), composer son of George Crumb
 Ann Crumb (1950–2019),  actress daughter of George Crumb
 Jason Crumb, Canadian football player
 Mike Crumb, Canadian football player
 Robert Crumb, underground comic artist
 Charles Crumb (1942–1992), elder brother of Robert Crumb
 Maxon Crumb,  younger brother of Robert Crumb
 Aline Kominsky-Crumb,  wife of Robert Crumb
 Sophie Crumb, daughter of Robert Crumb